Roddy is a surname and a masculine given name, often a short form of Roderick.

People

Given name 
 Roddy Beaubois (born 1988), French basketball player
 Roddy Blackjack (c. 1927-2013), Canadian Chief of the Little Salmon/Carmacks First Nation of the Yukon
 Roddy Bottum (born 1960), American musician
 Roddy Burdine (1886-1936), American businessman
 Roddy Collins (born 1961), Irish football (soccer) player and manager
 Roddy Connolly (1901–1980), Irish politician
 Roddy Cordy-Simpson (born 1944), British general
 Roddy Darragon (born 1983), French cross-country skier
 Roddy Doyle (born 1958), Irish novelist
 Roddy Ellias (born 1949), Canadian musician
 Roddy Estwick (born 1961), Barbadian cricketer
 Roddy Evans (born 1934), Welsh rugby player
 Roddy Frame (born 1964), Scottish singer-songwriter and musician
Roddy Frame (swimmer) (born 1941) English swimmer
 Roddy Georgeson (born 1948), Egyptian footballer
 Roddy Grant (footballer) (born 1966), British footballer
 Roddy Grant (rugby union) (born 1987), Scottish rugby player
 Roddy Hart, Scottish singer–songwriter
 Roddy Hughes (1891-1970), British actor
 Roddy Jackson (born 1942), American musician
 Roddy Lamb (1899–?), American football player
 Roddy Langmuir (born 1960), British alpine skier
 Roddy Lee (born 1950) Chinese/American athlete
 Roddy Lenga (born 1990), Vanuatuan football player
 Roddy Llewellyn, English landscape gardener
 Roddy Lorimer (born 1953), Scottish musician
 Roddy Manley (born 1965), Scottish footballer
 Roddy Maude-Roxby (born 2 April 1930), English actor
 Roddy McCorley (died 1800), Irish rebel
 Roddy (R.S.) MacDonald (born 1955), Scottish/Australian bagpipes composer
 Roddy McDowall (1928–1998), British actor
 Roddy McKenzie (born 1975), Scottish footballer 
 Roddy MacLennan (born 1989), Scottish footballer
 Roddy McMillan (1923–1979), Scottish actor and playwright
 Roddy Paterson (born 1993), Scottish footballer
 Roddy Piper (1954-2015), Scottish-Canadian professional wrestler
 Roddy Radiation (born 1955), English musician
 Roddy Ricch (born 1998), real name Rodrick Wayne Moore Jr., American rapper, singer, songwriter, and record producer
 Roddy Scott (1971-2002), British photojournalist
 Roddy Vargas (born 1978), Australian footballer
 Roddy White (born 1981), American football player
 Roddy Woomble (born 1976), Scottish singer

Surname 
 David Roddy (born 2001), American basketball player
 David Roddy (law enforcement), American retired police officer/chief
 Dennis Roddy (born 1954), American journalist
 Derek Roddy (born 1972), American drummer and snake breeder
 Joseph Roddy (1897–1965), Irish politician
 Martin Roddy (1887-1948), Irish politician
 Patrick Roddy (1827–1895), Irish colonel
 Rod Roddy (1937–2003), American television announcer

Stage name 
 Young Roddy, American rapper Roderick Brisco (born 1986)

Fictional characters 
 Roddy, in the British musical Boogie Nights (1997)
 Roddy, in the Roddy the Roadman children's book series
 Roddy, in the children's fantasy novel The Merlin Conspiracy
 Roddy, in the video game Top Hunter: Roddy & Cathy
 Roddy Berwick, in the film Downhill
 Roddy MacStew, a supporting character in Freakazoid! and Freakazoid's mentor
 Roddy St. James, the protagonist in Flushed Away

See also 

 Rod, a given name

 Roddie, a given name and surname

English-language masculine given names
Hypocorisms